Bookstaver is a surname. Notable people with the surname include:

Mary Bookstaver (1875–1950), American feminist, activist, and editor
Sanford Bookstaver (born 1973), American film director, television director, and television producer

See also
Jacob Bookstaver House